Boris Petrov Galchev (born 31 October 1983) is a Bulgarian professional footballer who plays as a midfielder for Bansko.

Career

Early career
Born in Razlog, but raised in Dobrinishte, Galchev started his career in the youth system of Pirin Blagoevgrad. Then he was released by Pirin after failing to progress into their first team and joined amateur side Pirin Razlog. In this period, along with his football career, he also worked as a lumberman.

Pirin Blagoevgrad
In 2007, Galchev returned to Pirin Blagoevgrad and helped the team gain promotion to the B Group. In December 2008, Pirin merged with the other club of Blagoevgrad, which in season 2008–09 was a part of A Group. Galchev was selected to join unions club.

He quickly became part of the main team and until the end of 2008–09 season earned 15 appearances playing in the A PFG, scoring one goal.

On 7 August 2009, Galchev was announced as Pirin's new club captain.

CSKA Sofia
On 12 January 2010, CSKA Sofia signed Galchev to a three-and-a-half-year deal. He was given the number 18 shirt. On 27 March 2010, he played in his first Eternal Derby against Levski Sofia after coming on as a substitute during the second half of the game. He established himself as a key player in the midfield for CSKA. For the Reds Galchev appeared in 60 games, scoring three goals.

Dinamo București
On 13 July 2012, Galchev signed with Romanian Liga I side Dinamo București for two years with an option for a year extension. As part of the deal, former CSKA Sofia striker Michel Platini returned to his previous club.

Botev Plovdiv
In early January 2013, Galchev returned to Bulgaria and signed a contract with Botev Plovdiv. On 3 January 2014 his contract was terminated by mutual agreement.

Return to CSKA
In January 2014, Galchev rejoined CSKA Sofia, with the expectation of improved financial parameters for the next season. During the 2014–15 A PFG season he has mostly seen action as a substitute. On 25 October 2014, he scored the third goal for his team in the 3–0 win over Levski Sofia in the Eternal Derby.  He was released in January 2017.

Septemvri Sofia
In January 2017, Galchev signed with Septemvri Sofia for two and a half years.

Galchev scored the winning goal for the first victory of Septemvri in First League for the season on 22 July 2017 in match against Pirin Blagoevgrad.

International career
Galchev earned his first call-up to the Bulgaria national side in March 2011 for the Euro 2012 qualifier against Switzerland and the friendly match versus Cyprus, but was not selected to play in any of these games.  He was also called up for the friendly against Hungary in February 2012, but did not feature in the match. Galchev made his debut on 29 May 2012, after coming on as a substitute in a 2–0 loss against Turkey in an exhibition game.

He has also played for Bulgaria at the amateur level.

Career statistics

Club

Honours

Club
CSKA Sofia
 Bulgarian Cup (2): 2010–11, 2015–16

References

External links

1983 births
Living people
Association football midfielders
Bulgarian footballers
Bulgaria international footballers
FC Pirin Razlog players
OFC Pirin Blagoevgrad players
PFC Pirin Blagoevgrad players
PFC CSKA Sofia players
FC Dinamo București players
Botev Plovdiv players
FC Septemvri Sofia players
FC Tsarsko Selo Sofia players
First Professional Football League (Bulgaria) players
Liga I players
Expatriate footballers in Romania
People from Razlog
Sportspeople from Blagoevgrad Province